The Men's tournament of the Volleyball competition at the 2015 Pacific Games was held from July 11–18, 2015 at the Taurama Aquatic Centre Courts in Port Moresby. Wallis and Futuna won the gold medal, defeating New Caledonia in the final.

Participating teams
Eleven men's teams participated in the tournament:

Pool A

Pool B

Preliminary round

Pool A

|}

|}

Pool B

|}

|}

Final round

Semifinals

|}

Ninth place game

|}

Seventh place game

|}

Fifth place game

|}

Bronze medal match

|}

Gold medal match

|}

See also
 Volleyball at the 2015 Pacific Games – Women's tournament

References

Pacific Games Men
Volleyball at the 2015 Pacific Games